Woodbine is an unincorporated community in Woodbine Township, Jo Daviess County, Illinois, United States. It lies east of Elizabeth and west of Stockton along U.S. Route 20, in the Driftless Zone. Woodbine features a mechanic shop, a championship golf course, two specialty shops and Grace Bible Church.

References

External links
 illinois.hometownlocator.com
 USGNIS Survey

Unincorporated communities in Jo Daviess County, Illinois
Unincorporated communities in Illinois